Boot to the Head is a comedy album performed by the Canadian comedy troupe The Frantics. Originally released as an LP in 1987, it was re-issued in 1996 as a CD with the same track listing. The album features a number of skits from their radio show Frantic Times, as well as a few sketches that could not be aired to a general audience. The sketches were recorded over a three-day period in front of a live audience at the Toronto Free Theatre.

Personnel
 Paul Chato
 Rick Green
 Dan Redican
 Peter Wildman

Track listing
"A Piece of Pie" – 4:33
"I Shot Bambi's Mother" – 1:20
"Driving Chicks Mad" – 3:23
"A Poem" – 0:35
"Game Show, Game Show" – 2:02
"Bill from Bala" – 4:42
"A Poem" – 3:11
"Architecture Today" – 3:11
"Mrs. G" – 2:24
"Worshippers 'R' Us" – 4:05
"You People Are Fat" – 3:32
"Making Love" – 2:14
"A Poem" – 1:12
"Make Up Dirty Words" – 1:58
"You Scare the **** Out of Me" – 2:53
"Ti Kwan Leep" – 4:52
"Boot to the Head" – 1:36

"Ti Kwan Leep" is one of the most famous skits from this album, followed by the title song "Boot to the Head". These are both regularly played on the Doctor Demento radio show. In the skit, there is a conversation between Ed Gruberman and a martial arts master over the relative merits of harmonious Eastern philosophy versus "trashing bozos". This soon devolves into an all-out brawl. The song recites a long litany of people doing idiotic things, and recommending that we "Give them a boot to the head!" However, their iconic phrase became famous three years earlier in "Last Will and Temperament" from their Frantic Times album.

Several of the other skits are also considered to be classics, such as "A Piece Of Pie", and "You Scare The **** Out Of Me", which have occasionally appeared in the troupe's shows after their reunion in 2004 and 2005. The former skit involves a man who confides to his friend that he has just excreted a whole, well-formed piece of pie, and the latter is a self-explanatory song. Neither skit could have been aired on their long-running CBC radio show.

Despite the resemblance, Frantics member Paul Chato claims the person getting his head booted on the cover is not supposed to be him.

References

External links
Albums listings on The Frantics official Web site
Frantics Discography
The full text and MP3 of "Ti Kwan Leep" skit

The Frantics (comedy) albums
1987 albums
1980s comedy albums